Mandakini Behera is a Politician in Odisha. She served as the Member of Legislative Assembly for Nayagarh for the years 2002–2004.

Early life and education
Mandakini Behera was born to Alekh Chandra Das in Nayagarh district of Odisha and she graduated in B.A and B.Ed. She married a Yadav politician Bhagabat Behera.

References

1947 births
Living people
Odisha politicians
Biju Janata Dal politicians